"Errtime" (stands for Everytime) is a single by the rapper Nelly released in March 2005, from the soundtrack to the 2005 film, The Longest Yard (which featured Nelly alongside Chris Rock and Adam Sandler). The song managed strong digital download and close to no airplay, balancing out to its Billboard peak of #24. The official video for the song features cameo appearance by Snoop Dogg, and the actor Adam Sandler at the end of the video. Also the video features a few scenes from the movie, including the scene with D12.

Track listing
Errtime (Clean) - 4:10
Errtime (Album) - 4:10
Errtime (Instrumental) - 4:08

Charts

Certifications

References

Nelly songs
2005 singles
Songs written by Nelly
Universal Records singles
Song recordings produced by Jazze Pha
2005 songs